Rivière-aux-Saumons Aerodrome  is a registered aerodrome located  west of Rivière-aux-Saumons, Anticosti Island, Quebec, Canada.

Airlines and destinations

References

Registered aerodromes in Côte-Nord
Anticosti Island